Amelia Jenks Bloomer (May 27, 1818 – December 30, 1894) was an American newspaper editor, women's rights and temperance advocate. Even though she did not create the women's clothing reform style known as bloomers, her name became associated with it because of her early and strong advocacy. In her work with The Lily, she became the first woman to own, operate and edit a newspaper for women.

Early life
Amelia Jenks was born in 1818 in Homer, New York, to Ananias Jenks and Lucy (Webb) Jenks. She was one of the youngest in her large family, having at least 4 sisters and 2 brothers. She came from a family of modest means and received only a few years of formal education in the local district school.

Career
After a brief time as a school teacher at the age of 17, she decided to relocate, and moved in with her newly married sister Elvira, then living in Waterloo. Within a year she had moved into the home of the Oren Chamberlain family in Seneca Falls to act as the live-in governess for their three youngest children.

On April 15, 1840, when she was 22, she married law student Dexter Bloomer who encouraged her to write for his New York newspaper, the Seneca Falls County Courier. Bloomer supported her activism; he even gave up drinking as part of the Temperance Movement.

She spent her early years in Cortland County, New York. Bloomer and her family moved to Iowa in 1852.

Social activism
In 1848, Bloomer attended the Seneca Falls Convention, the first women's rights convention, though she did not sign the Declaration of Sentiments and subsequent resolutions, due to her deep connection with the Episcopal Church. This meeting would serve as her inspiration to start her newspaper.

The following year, she began editing the first newspaper by and for women, The Lily. Published biweekly from 1849 until 1853, the newspaper began as a temperance journal, but came to have a broad mix of contents ranging from recipes to moralist tracts, particularly when under the influence of suffragists Elizabeth Cady Stanton and Susan B. Anthony. Bloomer felt that because women lecturers were considered unseemly, writing was the best way for women to work for reform. Originally, The Lily was to be for “home distribution” among members of the Seneca Falls Ladies Temperance Society, which had formed in 1848, and eventually had a circulation of over 4,000. The paper encountered several obstacles early on, and the Society's enthusiasm died out. Bloomer felt a commitment to publish and assumed full responsibility for editing and publishing the paper. Originally, the title page had the legend “Published by a committee of ladies.” But after 1850 – only Bloomer's name appeared on the masthead. This newspaper was a model for later periodicals focused on women's suffrage.

Bloomer described her experience as the first woman to own, operate and edit a news vehicle for women:

In her publication, Bloomer promoted a change in dress standards for women that would be less restrictive in regular activities.

In 1851, New England temperance activist Elizabeth Smith Miller (aka Libby Miller) adopted what she considered a more rational costume: loose trousers gathered at the ankles, like women's trousers worn in the Middle East and Central Asia, topped by a short dress or skirt and vest. Miller displayed her new clothing to Stanton, her cousin, who found it sensible and becoming, and adopted it immediately. In this garb Stanton visited Bloomer, who began to wear the costume and promote it enthusiastically in her magazine.  Articles on the clothing trend were picked up in The New York Tribune.  More women wore the fashion which was promptly dubbed The Bloomer Costume or "Bloomers".  However, the Bloomers were subjected to ceaseless ridicule in the press and harassment on the street. Bloomer herself returned to longer skirts by 1859, noting that her motives were several-fold: after moving to Iowa, she felt a desire to blend in to her new social world and make friends, which she felt was easier in more fashionable garments. She also noted that a new invention, the crinoline, did away with the heavy underskirts that she had objected to, and that she felt there were other more important things for her to focus her energy on.

Also in 1851, Bloomer introduced the suffragettes Elizabeth Cady Stanton and Susan B. Anthony to each other.

In 1854, when Bloomer and her husband decided to move to Council Bluffs, Iowa, Bloomer sold The Lily to Mary Birdsall in Richmond, Indiana. Birdsall and Dr. Mary F. Thomas kept the publication going at least through 1859.

Bloomer remained a suffrage pioneer and writer throughout her life, writing for a wide array of periodicals. Although Bloomer was far less famous than some other feminists, she made many significant contributions to the women's movement — particularly concerning dress reform. Bloomer also led suffrage campaigns in Nebraska and Iowa and served as president of the Iowa Woman Suffrage Association from 1871 until 1873.

Death and burial
She died in 1894, at the age of 76, and is buried in Fairview Cemetery, Council Bluffs, Iowa.

Commemorations

She is commemorated together with Elizabeth Cady Stanton, Sojourner Truth, and Harriet Ross Tubman in the calendar of saints of the Episcopal Church on July 20. In 1975 she was inducted into the Iowa Women's Hall of Fame. In 1980 her home at Seneca Falls, New York, known as the Amelia Bloomer House, was listed on the National Register of Historic Places. In 1995 she was inducted into the National Women's Hall of Fame. In 1999 a sculpture by Ted Aub was unveiled commemorating when on May 12, 1851, Bloomer introduced Susan B. Anthony to Elizabeth Cady Stanton. This sculpture, called "When Anthony Met Stanton", consists of the three women depicted as life-size bronze statues, and is placed overlooking Van Cleef Lake in Seneca Falls, New York, where the introduction occurred.

From 2002 until 2020, the American Library Association produced an annual Amelia Bloomer List of recently published books with significant feminist content for younger readers. However, in 2020 the list's name was changed to Rise: A Feminist Book Project for Ages 0–18, explained as such: "The project has been promoting quality feminist literature for young readers since 2002 as a part of the Feminist Task Force and the Social Responsibilities Round Table [both of the American Library Association]. [In 2020,] the committee was made aware that, though Amelia Bloomer had a platform as a publisher, she refused to speak against the Fugitive Slave Law of 1850 (Simmons). SRRT and FTF believe librarians and libraries must work to correct social problems and inequities with particular attention to intersectionality, feminism, and deliberate anti-racism. As a result, the committee unanimously voted in favor of a name change. Rise: A Feminist Book Project for Ages 0-18, reflects the diversity and inclusion for which feminism as a whole — and this committee specifically—strives."

See also
Amelia Bloomer House
List of suffragists and suffragettes
List of women's rights activists
Victorian dress reform

Notes

References

Bibliography
 Bloomer, Dexter C. Life and Writings of Amelia Bloomer. Boston: Arena Pub. Co., 1895.   Reprinted 1975 by Schocken Books, New York. Includes bibliographical references.
 Coon, Anne C. Hear Me Patiently: The Reform Speeches of Amelia Jenks Bloomer, Vol. 138. Greenwood Publishing Group, Inc., 1994.
 Smith, Stephanie, Household Words: Bloomers, sucker, bombshell, scab, cyber (2006) -- material on changing usage of words.
 The Lily: A Ladies' Journal, devoted to Temperance and Literature. 1849.

External links

 Spartacus biography
 Biography/Pottawattamie County, Iowa

Norwood, Arlisha. "Amelia Bloomer". National Women's History Museum. 2017.
 BBC video article on Amelia Jenks Bloomer, 4 July 2019

1818 births
1894 deaths
American feminists
American suffragists
People from Cortland, New York
People from Council Bluffs, Iowa
Anglican saints
19th-century Christian saints
American temperance activists
American women journalists
19th-century American women writers
19th-century American journalists
Christian female saints of the Late Modern era
Journalists from New York (state)
Activists from New York (state)
American saints